Bradbury may refer to:

People
Bradbury (surname)
Baron Bradbury, a title in the Peerage of the United Kingdom, including three barons with the surname Bradbury.

Places
Bradbury, County Durham, England
Bradbury, California, city of the United States of America
Bradbury Township, Minnesota, United States of America
Bradbury, New South Wales, a suburb of Sydney, Australia
Bradbury Landing, Aeolis Palus, Mars

Other uses
Bradbury Building, Los Angeles, California
Bradbury Science Museum, at the Los Alamos National Laboratory
Justice Bradbury (disambiguation)
Bradbury Motor Cycles, was a British motorcycle manufacturer based in Oldham, England